The Cerro Chajnantor Atacama Telescope (CCAT) is a proposed  diameter telescope that is intended to reveal the cosmic origins of stars, planets, and galaxies with its submillimeter cameras and spectrometers enabled by superconducting detector arrays. The telescope was originally called the Cornell Caltech Atacama Telescope, but due to lack of funding the 25 metre telescope is currently on hold.

The collaboration is building a smaller  diameter submillimeter/millimeter telescope, CCAT-prime, as a first step before pursuing the 25 metre CCAT at some (unknown) time in the future. CCAT-prime is based on a high optical throughput Crossed Dragone optical design, and the Simons Observatory large aperture telescope uses the same optical design. CCAT-prime will be located at the same site and share similar mission as the full sized CCAT, but naturally with reduced angular resolution compared to the 25 metre CCAT. 

On September 14, 2020, the CCAT-prime telescope was renamed to be the Fred Young Submillimeter Telescope (FYST) after Fred Young, a Cornell alumnus who has supported the telescope for about two decades with over US$16 million.

Site
FYST will be one of the highest permanent, ground-based telescopes in the world. The University of Tokyo Atacama Observatory is located slightly above the proposed telescope location on the same peak.

Description
The CCAT consortium participating in the project includes: Cornell University, University of Cologne, University of Bonn, University of Waterloo, University of British Columbia, and other institutions in the U.S., Germany, and Canada. 

The telescope is intended to complement the Atacama Large Millimeter Array (ALMA), by discovering new sources that ALMA will follow up with highly detailed imagery.

The FYST telescope is to be outfitted with a wide-field camera called Prime-Cam that is expected to map the sky many times faster than previous submillimeter instruments, including SCUBA-2 camera installed on the James Clerk Maxwell Telescope in Hawaii.  

The submillimeter and millimeter wavelength light that FYST will measure is a type of microwave radiation that is closest to infrared in the light spectrum. These measurements will enable astronomers to learn more about the Milky Way, local galaxies, Epoch of Reionization, and Cosmology.

Construction
In January 2014 the Chilean government granted the use of land on Cerro Chajnantor to the CCAT consortium for the telescope and the road to the mountain summit.   Also in  January 2014, the Atacama Astronomy Park was inaugurated by the Chilean government, to coordinate activities between the current and upcoming observatories in the Chajnantor region.

The 6 metre CCAT-prime telescope construction started 2017 (signing of construction contract) with first light expected in 2023. The fabrication of telescope components started late 2018.

See also
 Lists of telescopes
 Martha P. Haynes, project director, originally proposed with Riccardo Giovanelli in the mid-1990s that a CCAT-like telescope be built
 Riccardo Giovanelli, originally proposed with Martha Haynes in the mid-1990s that a CCAT-like telescope be built

References

Astronomical observatories in Chile
Submillimetre telescopes
Atacama Desert
Proposed buildings and structures in Chile
Buildings and structures in Antofagasta Region